Víctor José Luengo Ciscar (born February 1, 1974) is a former Spanish professional basketball player. Luengo played the majority of his career with Valencia Basket, as he spent 14 seasons with the club. He finished his career with two seasons for Gandía BA in the second division LEB Oro. His jersey number 15 was retired by Valencia.

References

1974 births
Living people
Shooting guards
Small forwards
Spanish men's basketball players
Sportspeople from Valencia
Valencia Basket players